Asante Ashland Community Hospital is a hospital in Ashland, Oregon, United States. Founded in 1907, it is part of the Asante Health System. In 2012, it explored an affiliation with Dignity Health, with the latter stopping negotiations in October 2012 over some resistance to the plan. On November 15, 2012, Ashland Community Hospital chose to partner with Asante, the owner of Three Rivers Medical Center and Rogue Regional Medical Center, to build a stronger financial base for the hospital. Ashland's city council approved the transfer to Asante in June 2013.

The hospital has 49 beds for inpatients, a diagnostic and surgery center with imaging equipment, a laboratory, and equipment for respiratory testing and surgery. Outpatient services cover internal medicine, family medicine, endocrinology, general surgery, orthopedic surgery  and wound care.

The hospital is accredited by the DNV GL Healthcare.

See also
List of hospitals in Oregon

References

 

Hospitals in Oregon
Buildings and structures in Ashland, Oregon
Hospitals established in 1907
1907 establishments in Oregon